Northwestern Region may refer to 

Northwestern Region (Iceland), traditional region of Iceland
Northern & Western Region, statistical region of Ireland

See also
Ilocos Region, northern region of city of Luzon, Philippines